This is a list of elections in Canada scheduled to be held in 2018. Included are municipal, provincial and federal elections, by-elections on any level, referendums and party leadership races at any level. In bold are provincewide or federal elections (including provincewide municipal elections) and party leadership races.

January to March
January 10: Mayoral by-election in Gravelbourg, Saskatchewan
January 17: Municipal by-election in the Rural Municipality of Torch River No. 488, Saskatchewan 
January 20: Municipal by-elections in Burns Lake and Hudson's Hope, British Columbia.
January 27: 2018 Saskatchewan Party leadership election
February 3: 2018 British Columbia Liberal Party leadership election
February 5: Municipal by-election in Beaumont, Alberta.
February 10: Lennox Island First Nation band on-reserve councillor by-election.
February 14: 
Provincial by-election in Kelowna West, British Columbia
Municipal by-election in Leader, Saskatchewan
February 22: Municipal by-election in Coalhurst, Alberta
February 24: Municipal by-election in Port Alice, British Columbia
February 27: 2018 Alberta Party leadership election
February 28: Municipal by-election in Osler, Saskatchewan
March 1: Provincial by-elections in Kindersley, Melfort and Swift Current, Saskatchewan.
March 3: 2018 Saskatchewan New Democratic Party leadership election
March 7: Municipal by-election in Naicam, Saskatchewan
March 10: 2018 Progressive Conservative Party of Ontario leadership election
March 13: Municipal by-election in Happy Valley-Goose Bay

April to May
April 7: 
2018 New Democratic Party of Newfoundland and Labrador leadership election
2018 New Democratic Party of Prince Edward Island leadership election
Municipal by-election in Cariboo Regional District, British Columbia
April 10: Peter Ballantyne Cree Nation election for chief and 14 positions on the band council and 12 spots on the band's elders' council
April 11: 
Municipal by-election in Kindersley, Saskatchewan
Municipal by-election in Lougheed, Alberta
April 20: Wei Wai Kum First Nation chief councillor by-election.
April 28: 2018 Progressive Conservative Party of Newfoundland and Labrador leadership election
May 5: Saulteau First Nations council by-election.
May 7: Yukon School Council General Election
May 13: Municipal by-election in Saint-Rémi, Quebec
May 14: Municipal by-elections in Atholville, Bas-Caraquet, Bathurst, Dieppe, Fredericton Junction, Grande-Anse, Hartland, Kedgwick, Pointe-Verte, Saint-André, Saint-Léolin, Sainte-Marie-Saint-Raphaël and St. George, New Brunswick
May 23: Municipal by-elections in Carlyle and Caronport, Saskatchewan

June to July
June 3: Municipal by-election in Lachute, Quebec
June 7: 2018 Ontario general election
June 9: Municipal by-election in Wells, British Columbia
June 10: Municipal by-elections in Beloeil and Shawville, Quebec
June 12: 
St. Mary's First Nation elects a new chief and band council
Municipal by-election in Elk Point, Alberta.
Nisga'a Village Government by-election in Gingolx.
June 18: 
Federal by-election in Chicoutimi—Le Fjord, Quebec
Municipal by-election for a council seat in Wabush, Newfoundland and Labrador
June 19: Provincial by-election in Cumberland South, Nova Scotia
June 27: By-election in Codette, Saskatchewan, for three councillors and mayor
June 28: Municipal by-election in Eston, Saskatchewan.
June 30: Akwesasne District Council of Chiefs
July 9: Municipal by-election in Bruderheim, Alberta
July 12: Provincial by-elections in Fort McMurray-Conklin and Innisfail-Sylvan Lake, Alberta
July 14: Municipal by-election in Kivimaa-Moonlight Bay, Saskatchewan
July 17: Provincial by-election in St. Boniface, Manitoba
July 23: Municipal by-election in Calmar, Alberta.
July 27: Municipal elections in Dunnottar, Victoria Beach and Winnipeg Beach, Manitoba.

August to October
August 16: Municipal by-election in Brooks, Alberta
September 10: Municipal by-election in Raymond, Alberta
September 12: Provincial by-election in Regina Northeast, Saskatchewan
September 19: Municipal by-election in Langham, Saskatchewan
September 20: Provincial by-election in Windsor Lake, Newfoundland and Labrador
September 24: 2018 New Brunswick general election
October 1: 2018 Quebec general election
October 11: Moose Cree First Nation council by-election
October 14: Mayoral by-election in Témiscouata-sur-le-Lac, Quebec
October 15: Northwest Territories municipal elections, 2018 (taxed communities)
October 17: By-election for Moose Jaw council and Holy Trinity Roman Catholic Separate School Division No. 22.
October 18: Yukon municipal elections, 2018
October 20: 2018 British Columbia municipal elections
October 21: Municipal by-election in L'Ange-Gardien, Outaouais, Quebec (du Plateau District)
October 22: 2018 Ontario municipal elections
October 24: 
2018 Manitoba municipal elections
Municipal by-election in Rosetown, Saskatchewan
October 27: 2018 Progressive Conservative Association of Nova Scotia leadership election
October 29: Municipal by-election in Redwater, Alberta

November to December
November 3: Progressive Conservative Party of Saskatchewan leadership race
November 4: Municipal by-election in Contrecoeur, Quebec.
November 5: 2018 Prince Edward Island municipal elections
November 11: Municipal by-election in Marieville, Quebec.
November 13: Calgary Olympic plebiscite.
November 18: Municipal by-election in Nicolet, Quebec 
November 23: Bluewater District School Board trustee by-election for West Grey and Hanover. 
November 29: 
Municipal by-election in Division No. 7, County of Minburn No. 27, Alberta
Conseil Scolaire Viamonde Area 8 (Chatham-Kent, Elgin, Haldimand-Norfolk, Lambton & Oxford) trustee by-election.
December 3: 
Nunavut municipal elections, 2018 (hamlets)
Federal by-election in Leeds—Grenville—Thousand Islands and Rideau Lakes, Ontario
October 22-December 7: 2018 British Columbia electoral reform referendum
December 9: Municipal by-election in Neufchâtel-Lebourgneuf District, Quebec City 
December 10: 
Northwest Territories municipal elections, 2018 (hamlets)
Provincial by-election in Roberval, Quebec
December 16: Mayoral by-election in Rivière-des-Prairies–Pointe-aux-Trembles borough and council by-election in Saint-Michel, Montreal.

To be determined
Four federal by-elections were held in Burnaby South, Outremont, and York—Simcoe.

See also
Municipal elections in Canada
Elections in Canada

References

External links
Local by-election in British Columbia
Government of Canada electoral calendar
Elections Quebec: By-elections in municipalities with 5,000 inhabitants or more

 
Political timelines of the 2010s by year